The Staib LB-2, also called the Little Bastard, Little Bit and The Monster, is a homebuilt aircraft design of Wilbur Staib. It once held the title as the "worlds smallest monoplane".

Design and development
Wilbur Staib (1914-1993) was a self-taught aircraft designer from Diamond, Missouri. Staib served as a flight instructor during the Second World War at Chanute, Kansas flying PT-14s. Staib designed and built five different "LB" (Little Bastard) aircraft and a helicopter, of which several had the title "world's smallest" at their time of construction. Staib flew his aircraft in airshows with the title "The Diamond Wizard".

The LB-2 is a single engine low-wing, open cockpit monoplane with conventional landing gear. LB-2 was the considered the "World's Smallest Monoplane" when built to take the title from Ray Stits  span aircraft. The wing section was adapted from a Piper Cub airfoil.

Operational history
The LB-2 was flown at near top speed, with stalls untested. The roll rate was good, but turns were difficult. The fuselage was disassembled in 1953 to build the Staib LB-3 biplane.

The LB-3 used new  span wings made in the same fashion as Staib's LB-1 with brazed steel spring wing ribs with Taylorcraft airfoil sections. Cliff Baker operated the aircraft one more season, suffering a broken back after a high-speed incident.

Variants
Staib LB-3
Biplane built from fuselage of the LB-2
Staib LB-5
"Little Bit" Volkswagen powered variant. One on display at the Mid-America Air Museum.

Specifications (Staib LB-1)

References

Homebuilt aircraft
Low-wing aircraft
Single-engined tractor aircraft